Bindrich is a surname. Notable people with the surname include:

Falko Bindrich (born 1990), German chess grandmaster
Karsten Bindrich (born 1973), German sport shooter

German-language surnames